The Flores warty pig (Sus celebensis floresianus), is a subspecies in the pig genus (Sus) found in southern Asia.

References

External links
Sus heureni in The Species 2000 & ITIS Catalogue of Life.

Suidae